Australia national under-17 soccer team may refer to:

 Australia men's national under-17 soccer team
 Australia women's national under-17 soccer team

See also
 Australia national under-23 soccer team
 Australia national under-20 soccer team
 Australia national soccer team